J. C. Collings was a South African cricket umpire. He stood in nine Test matches between 1931 and 1936.

Collings umpired 23 first-class matches between 1928 and 1938. He officiated in the last four Tests of the series between South Africa and England in 1930–31 and all five of the Tests between South Africa and Australia in 1935–36. Aside from some of his Test matches, all the matches he umpired were held in Cape Town.

See also
 List of Test cricket umpires

References

Year of birth missing
Year of death missing
Place of birth missing
Missing middle or first names
South African Test cricket umpires